Gorsial is a village of Shakargarh tehsil, Narowal District. Its population is about 5000. It is a Union council.[clarification needed]. It is located near badwal forest which surrounds the village from south side. Village has primary schools for boys and girls. Literacy rate is significantly high. The village has a rich agricultural base; rice, wheat, cane and, millet are important crops. A water tunnel surrounds the village on the north to west sides, while open fields are present on the eastern side. Village lacks the basic facilities. Most of its inhabitants have joined the armed forces and a significant number of people have gone abroad for earning purposes.

Cricket, volleyball and soccer are most played games here. Shrines of Baba Lal Hussain Shah Bukhari and Baba Peer Shah are popular sacred places among the people of the village. Paa Hashim and Baba Shahab were the notable agri advisers, significant farmers and selfmade figures of the village. Baba Shafi, late was one of the most popular religious man and was famous with the title of Key Of The Heaven.

Villagescape

References

Villages in Narowal District